Tan Yinglan (born 8 June 1981) is a Singaporean businessman and writer. He is the Founding Managing Partner of Insignia Ventures Partners and serves as a member of the board of directors of Carro, Payfazz, Shipper, Flip, Super and many other technology companies. 

Prior to this, he was a venture partner with Sequoia Capital till June 2017. 

He is the author of The Way Of The VC – Top Venture Capitalists On Your Board. and "Chinnovation - How Chinese Innovators are Changing the World", both published by John Wiley & Sons and  New Venture Creation - Entrepreneurship for the 21st Century - An Asian Perspective, published by Mcgraw-Hill and Navigating ASEANnovation, published by World Scientific. In his spare time, he serves as a member of the board of directors of Hwa Chong Institution.

Tan has been named as a World Economic Forum (WEF) Young Global Leader (2012–2017) and served as a Selection Committee Member on the WEF Technology Pioneers (2015 – 2017), WEF Global Agenda Council member on Fostering Entrepreneurship (2011 - 2014)

Tan is an Honorary Adjunct Associate Professor at National University of Singapore and serves on the Strategic Research Innovation Fund Investment Committee at Nanyang Technology University.

References

External links
 Official webpage

1981 births
Living people
Singaporean businesspeople